Leonard Bruce Julians (19 June 1933 – 17 December 1993) was an English footballer who played as a centre forward in the Football League for Leyton Orient, Arsenal, Nottingham Forest, Millwall and the Detroit Cougars during his footballing career. Julians also managed Kenyan club Gor Mahia, with him being one of the most successful and respected managers in the outfit's history.

Career
He started as an amateur at Walthamstow Avenue before turning professional with Leyton Orient in 1956. He helped the Brisbane Road club to the Division Three South Championship with 11 goals in ten games in his first season, scoring 35 goals overall in his 66 games.

His goal scoring form attracted the attention of First Division Arsenal, who signed him in December 1958. His chances were limited but scored 10 goals in 24 appearances in all competitions. He was sent off by Referee Les Hamer in 53rd minute of the North London Derby at White Hart Lane in January 1959 for kicking Spurs centre half Maurice Norman which the Gunners won 4–1.

In the Summer of 1960 he joined First Division Nottingham Forest where he scored 24 goals in 58 league games. He left Forest at the age 30, in January 1964, to join ex-teammate Billy Gray who had become Player–Manager at Millwall in Division Three.

While he was unable to prevent relegation to Division Four, Millwall would bounce back with successive promotions, Julians contributing 40 goals in these two seasons. He played in 52 games of Millwall's then League record home unbeaten record of 59 games, scoring 35 goals, which ended on 14 January 1967 with a 2–1 defeat to Plymouth.

Len left Millwall at the end of the 1966/67 season for a short spell in United States with Detroit Cougars where he became their Coach after a playing injury. He also had a spell as Manager of Gor Mahia in Nirobi Kenya, where he steered Taya toward winning three league titles in 1983, 1985 and 1991.

After retiring from football he ran a garage with former teammate Bryan Snowden in Meopham before his death in Southend on 17 December 1993.

Honours
Millwall F.C. Hall of Fame

References

Bibliography

External links
 

1933 births
1993 deaths
English footballers
English expatriate footballers
Footballers from Tottenham
Association football forwards
Arsenal F.C. players
Leyton Orient F.C. players
Nottingham Forest F.C. players
Millwall F.C. players
English Football League players
Walthamstow Avenue F.C. players
North American Soccer League (1968–1984) players
Detroit Cougars (soccer) players
English expatriate sportspeople in the United States
Expatriate soccer players in the United States
Expatriate football managers in Kenya
Gor Mahia F.C. managers
English football managers
Association football coaches